The 1938 Ohio State Buckeyes football team represented Ohio State University in the 1938 Big Ten Conference football season. The Buckeyes compiled a 4–3–1 record and outscored opponents 119–65.

Schedule

Coaching staff
 Francis Schmidt, head coach, fifth year

1939 NFL draftees

References

Ohio State
Ohio State Buckeyes football seasons
Ohio State Buckeyes football